Abbate Point is a former settlement in Newfoundland and Labrador.

Ghost towns in Newfoundland and Labrador